Giovanni Lavrendi (born April 20, 1986) is an Italian footballer who plays as a midfielder for A.C.R. Messina.

Career

Messina
On 20 November 2019 it was confirmed, that Lavrendi for the second time had returned to Italian Serie D club A.C.R. Messina on a free transfer. He signed a deal for the rest of the season.

References

External links
Giovanni Lavrendi at ACR Messina's website

1986 births
Living people
Italian footballers
Association football midfielders
Vigor Lamezia players
A.C. Mezzocorona players
U.S. Vibonese Calcio players
A.C.R. Messina players
Serie D players
U.S. Castrovillari Calcio players